Kurtanidze is a Georgian surname. Notable people with the surname include:

Eldar Kurtanidze (born 1972), Georgian wrestler 
Koba Kurtanidze (1964–2005), Soviet Judoka

Surnames of Georgian origin
Georgian-language surnames